Bernd-Jürgen Marschner is a German rower.

Marschner won silver with the West German eight at the 1961 European Rowing Championships in Prague. He won a gold medal at the 1962 World Rowing Championships in Lucerne with the men's coxed four.

References

Year of birth missing (living people)
West German male rowers
World Rowing Championships medalists for West Germany
Possibly living people
European Rowing Championships medalists